Gustaf Adolf (Kyösti Aatu) Kanniainen (22 February 1871, Oulu – 22 June 1915) was a Finnish journalist and politician. He belonged to the Young Finnish Party. He served as a Member of the Diet of Finland from 1905 to 1906 and as a Member of the Parliament of Finland from 1913 to 1915.

References

1871 births
1915 deaths
People from Oulu
People from Oulu Province (Grand Duchy of Finland)
Young Finnish Party politicians
Members of the Diet of Finland
Members of the Parliament of Finland (1913–16)
Finnish journalists
Male journalists